Twelve United States presidents have made presidential visits to the United Kingdom and Ireland. The first visit by an incumbent president to the United Kingdom was made in December 1918 by Woodrow Wilson, and was an offshoot of American diplomatic interactions with the Principal Allied Powers at the conclusion of World War I prior to the Paris Peace Conference. The first visit by an incumbent president to Ireland was made in June 1963 by John F. Kennedy. To date, 39 visits have been made to the United Kingdom and eleven to Ireland.

The United States is bound together with both Ireland and the United Kingdom by shared history, an overlap in religion and a common language and legal system, plus kinship ties that reach back hundreds of years, including kindred, ancestral lines among Cornish Americans, English Americans, Manx Americans, Irish Americans, Scotch-Irish Americans, Scottish Americans, Welsh Americans, and American Britons respectively.

Table of visits

Gallery

See also
 United Kingdom–United States relations
 Ireland–United States relations
 Foreign policy of the United States
 Foreign relations of the United States

References

External links
 Visits of Presidents of the United States to the United Kingdom, website of the U.S. Embassy and Consulates in the United Kingdom

United Kingdom–United States relations
Lists of United States presidential visits
Ireland–United States relations